"Jello" is a song by Asian-American hip hop group Far East Movement, released in the United States on the 1 November, 2011, initially as the lead single from their upcoming fourth studio album Dirty Bass. However, due to poor charting the song was later cut from the album. The song was produced by the Stereotypes and features rapper Rye Rye. The hook of the song interpolates part of Pimp C's verse of the song "Big Pimpin'" by Jay-Z.

Music video
A music video to accompany the release of "Jello" was first released onto YouTube on 19 January 2012 at a total length of three minutes and six seconds.

Live performances
Far East Movement performed the song live American late-night talk show Jimmy Kimmel Live!.

Track listing
US Digital download
 "Jello" (feat. Rye Rye) - 2:52

Credits and personnel
 Lead vocals – Far East Movement & Rye Rye
Producers – Stereotypes
Lyrics – Jonathan Yip, Jeremy Reeves, Ray Romulus, Nathan Walker, James Roh, Kevin Nishimura, Virman Coquia, Jae Choung
Label: Interscope Records

Chart performance

Release history

References

2011 singles
Far East Movement songs
Song recordings produced by the Stereotypes
Songs written by Jonathan Yip
Songs written by Ray Romulus
Songs written by Jeremy Reeves